Bouea macrophylla, commonly known as gandaria or plum mango or mango plum in English, is a species of flowering plant native to Southeast Asia. The tree belongs to the family Anacardiaceae which also includes mango and cashew.

Description

The evergreen tree grows to heights of 25 meters.  Its leaves are lanceolate to elliptic in shape (see: Leaf shape), and range from 13 to 45 cm (5 to 17 inches) long and from 5 to 7 cm (2 to 3 inches) wide.

The fruit (resembling a mango) are green in colour and mature to an orange/yellow, with the seed being pink.  They grow to roughly 2 to 5 cm (0.7 to 1.9 inches) in diameter. The entire fruit, including its skin is edible. The fruit range from sweet to sour in flavor similar to the Alphonso mango, and have a light smell of turpentine. When ripe, the fruit is soft and has fibrous mango-like seeds.

Flowering and fruiting times differ for Thailand and Indonesia.
Thailand : flowers in November to December, and fruit appears from April to May.
Indonesia : flowers in June to November, and fruit appears from March to June.

Distribution
The tree is native to Indonesia, and Burma.  It is also found in Thailand, Laos, and Malaysia, where it is commercially grown.

Uses

Consumption
Both the leaves and fruit from the tree can be eaten. The leaves can be eaten raw when they are still young, and can be used in salads. While the seed is edible, the endosperm is generally bitter. The fruit is very acidic and has a mango-like flavour. It can be eaten raw, or made into dishes such as pickle, compote, or sambal. Unripened fruit can be used to make rojak and asinan. In Ambon, the fruit is made for juice.

Functional
The entire tree can be used as an ornamental fruit bearing shade tree due to its dense foliage.

Other names

Bouea macrophylla is commonly known in English as the "marian plum", "gandaria", "plum mango" and "mango plum".  In Malay, the tree is known as kundang in Malay and its fruit buah kundang.  The Malays differentiate between two varieties:

 Kundang daun kecil ("small-leaf kundang") also known as remia, remnia or rumenia.
 Kundang daun besar ("large-leaf kundang"), also known as kundang hutan ("jungle kundang) or setar.  This usually refers to Bouea oppositifolia, and is the origin of the toponym Alor Setar (with alor meaning "small stream").

In Indonesian, it is known as ramania and gandaria.  It is also known in Thai as maprang (มะปราง), mayong (มะยง) and mayong chit (มะยงชิด).  In Burmese as mayan-thi (မရန်းသီး); and in Vietnamese as thanh trà.

In 2015 a major retailer introduced the fruit to the British public under the name plango, apparently a portmanteau word for "plum" and "mango".  At the time the announcements noted the resemblance of the fruit to plums and mangoes, and some of the local press deliberately or naively announced that the fruit was a cross between a plum and a mango, which is not botanically plausible as plums and mangoes are not in the same family.

References

Sources
Bouea macrophylla taxonomy
Species with potential for commercial development
Mansfeld database
AgroForestryTree Database

macrophylla
Fruits originating in Asia